Orr Regional Airport  is a city-owned public-use airport located three nautical miles (6 km) southwest of the central business district of Orr, a city in Saint Louis County, Minnesota, United States.

Although most U.S. airports use the same three-letter location identifier for the FAA and IATA, this airport is assigned ORB by the FAA but has no designation from the IATA (which assigned ORB to Örebro Airport in Örebro, Sweden).

Facilities and aircraft 
It has one runway designated 13/31 with an asphalt surface measuring 4,000 by 75 feet (1,220 x 23 m).

For the 12-month period ending May 31, 2014, the airport had 2,500 general aviation aircraft operations; an average of 208 per month. In March 2017, there were 10 aircraft based at this airport; all 10 single-engine.

References

External links 
 Orr Regional Airport
 Aerial photo as of 10 May 1992 from USGS The National Map
 

Airports in Minnesota
Buildings and structures in St. Louis County, Minnesota
Transportation in St. Louis County, Minnesota